June Whitney Ogle-Thomas (born 26 September 1986) is a Guyanese former cricketer who played as a right-handed batter and wicket-keeper. She appeared in 6 One Day Internationals and 2 Twenty20 Internationals for West Indies between 2011 and 2013. She played domestic cricket for Guyana.

References

External links

1986 births
Living people
Guyanese women cricketers
West Indian women cricketers
West Indies women One Day International cricketers
West Indies women Twenty20 International cricketers